Francis Bach Hoang Nguyen-Tran (born 1996), known professionally as FrancisGotHeat, is a Canadian record producer and songwriter. He is best known for his production with several well-known artists, most notably Drake, Bryson Tiller, and Big Sean.

Early life and career
Francis was born in Toronto in 1996, where he was also raised by Vietnamese Catholic parents. He was brought up in a musical household and has five siblings.

Francis has been described as a child prodigy, due to his musical background. His work has been featured in publications such as Vice, CBC News, and Exclaim!, among others.

In late December 2020, he was Grammy nominated for the Grammy Award for Best Reggae Album, for his production work on Jamaican singer-songwriter Skip Marley's song, “Higher Place". He also signed with American record producer Malay.

Selected production discography
Selected production discography of FrancisGotHeat

References

Canadian record producers
Canadian people of Vietnamese descent
1996 births
Living people